Himantolophus brevirostris is a species of footballfish, a type of anglerfish. It is endemic to the north Atlantic Ocean. So far, only males of the species have been found.

References

Himantolophidae
Deep sea fish
Fish described in 1925
Taxa named by Charles Tate Regan